Yarra Glen is a town in Victoria, Australia, 40 km north-east from Melbourne's central business district, located within the Shire of Yarra Ranges local government area.

History
The Ryrie brothers (William, James and Donald) were the first Europeans to settle in the area, when they established the  Yering run in 1837 after droving their cattle from NSW. The brothers planted the first grape vines in the Yarra Valley in 1838 and produced their first wine in 1845. Joseph Furphy, often regarded as the father of the Australian novel, was born on the station in 1843.

The Post Office opened on 11 January 1861 as Yarra Flats and was renamed Yarra Glen in 1889 when the railway arrived.

The now National Trust-listed Yarra Glen Grand Hotel was established in 1888. Its four story Italianate tower was added subsequent to the construction of the original hotel building.

The Black Friday fires of 1939 badly damaged the area around Yarra Glen, as did the fires of 2009.

Sport
The town has an Australian Rules football team competing in the Yarra Valley Mountain District Football League.

Yarra Glen has a horse racing club, Yarra Valley Racing, which schedules around nine race meetings a year including the Yarra Glen Cup meeting in March.

Yarra Valley Harness Racing Club conducts regular meetings at its racetrack in the town.

See also
 Yarra Glen railway station

References

External links

 Yarra Glen - Tourism Victoria website
Yarra Glen Website

Towns in Victoria (Australia)
Yarra Valley
1861 establishments in Australia
Yarra Ranges